Patrick Vallée is a French football manager.

He returned to Singapore in 2020 as the Head of Technical Director for French Football Academy and as head coach for Arion Women's Football Club

References

External links
 Patrick Vallée Interview

Living people
French football managers
Singapore Premier League head coaches
Tanjong Pagar United FC head coaches
1962 births
Étoile FC managers